Mavis Maclean,  (born 31 December 1943) is a British legal scholar. She has carried out socio-legal research at the University of Oxford since 1974, and in 2001 founded the Oxford Centre for Family Law and Policy (OXFLAP).

In 1993 she was elected President of the Research Committee for the Sociology of Law, International Sociological Association, in 2000 a Trustee of the Law and Society Association. Maclean is also a Fellow of the Royal Society of Arts and the ESRC Research College SHARe. In 2011 she was the inaugural recipient of the Socio-Legal Studies Association's Prize for Contributions to the Socio-Legal Community.

Bibliography

Books

Journals

Book chapters

See also

Child custody
Divorce
Family law
Parental rights
Paternity (law)
Residence (ENG)
Professor Carol Smart
John Eekelaar

References

External links 
 Profile page: Mavis Maclean St Hilda's College, University of Oxford
 Profile page: Mavis Maclean Department of Social Policy and Intervention (SPI), University of Oxford

1943 births
Living people
British legal scholars
Commanders of the Order of the British Empire
Place of birth missing (living people)
British legal writers
Legal scholars of the University of Oxford
Sociologists of law
Fellows of the Academy of Social Sciences